Gunnar Bigum (13 September 1914 – 30 March 1983) was a Danish film actor. He appeared in 19 films between 1941 and 1968. He was born in Copenhagen, Denmark and died in Denmark.

Filmography

 Olsen-banden (1968)
 Mig og min lillebror (1967)
 Martha (1967)
 Jeg er sgu min egen (1967)
 Mor bag rattet (1965)
  (1965)
 Sommer i Tyrol (1964)
 Alt for kvinden (1964)
 Frøken Nitouche (1963)
 Det støver stadig (1962)
 Støv på hjernen (1961)
 Sjove år, De (1959)
 Kærlighedens melodi (1959)
 Onkel Bill fra New York (1959)
 Mig og min familie (1957)
 Tante Tut fra Paris (1956)
 Den store gavtyv (1956)
 Mod og mandshjerte (1955)
 Alle går rundt og forelsker sig (1941)

External links

1914 births
1983 deaths
Danish male film actors
Male actors from Copenhagen
20th-century Danish male actors